Frederick Piesse may refer to:
Frederick Henry Piesse (1853–1912), Western Australian businessman and politician
Frederick William Piesse (1848–1902), Tasmanian politician